Edward Matthew Rice (born July 28, 1960) is an American prelate of the Roman Catholic Church.  He has been serving as bishop of the Diocese of Springfield-Cape Girardeau in Missouri since 2016. Rice previously served as an auxiliary bishop of the Archdiocese of St. Louis in Missouri from 2010 to 2016.

Biography

Early life and education
Edward Rice was born July 28, 1960, in St. Louis, Missouri, one of the ten children of John and Helen (nee Madden) Rice. He graduated from St. Mary's High School in St. Louis. He received his Master of Divinity degree from Kenrick School of Theology in Shrewsbury, Missouri, in 1987.Rice was ordained a deacon on May 3, 1986, by Bishop J. Terry Steib.

Priestly Ordination and ministry
Rice was ordained to the priesthood for the Archdiocese of St. Louis on January 3, 1987, by Archbishop John L. May.  Rice started teaching at St. Mary's High School in 1991. In 1995, he became assistant director of Cardinal Glennon College in Shrewsury, the minor seminary of the archdiocese.  Rice was named director of Cardinal Glennon in 1996, holding that position until 2000.  

In 2000, Rice was appointed pastor of St. John the Baptist Parish in St. Louis. In 2008, he left St. John to become director of the Office of Vocations for the archdiocese. On July 2, 2008, Rice was appointed by the Vatican as a chaplain of his holiness with the title monsignor.

Auxiliary Bishop of St. Louis

On December 1, 2010, Pope Benedict XVI appointed Rice as an auxiliary bishop of the Archdiocese of Saint Louis and titular bishop of Sufes. Rice's episcopal consecration took place on January 13, 2011, at the Cathedral Basilica of Saint Louis in St. Louis.  Archbishop Robert Carlson was the principal consecrator. Bishops John R. Gaydos and Richard F. Stika were the principal co-consecrators. Cardinal Raymond Burke and Bishop Robert Hermann were also in attendance.

Bishop of Springfield-Cape Girardeau
On April 26, 2016, Pope Francis appointed Rice as bishop of the Diocese of Springfield-Cape Girardeau. His installation took place June 1, 2016, at St. Elizabeth Ann Seton Church in Springfield, Missouri.

See also

 Catholic Church hierarchy
 Catholic Church in the United States
 Historical list of the Catholic bishops of the United States
 List of Catholic bishops of the United States
 List of Saint Louis Bishops
 Lists of patriarchs, archbishops, and bishops

References

External links

 Roman Catholic Diocese of Springfield–Cape Girardeau Official Site
 USCCB Bishops Directory

Episcopal succession
 

 

Living people
1960 births
21st-century American Roman Catholic titular bishops
Kenrick–Glennon Seminary alumni
Pontifical North American College alumni
Roman Catholic Archdiocese of St. Louis
Religious leaders from Missouri
American Roman Catholic clergy of Irish descent